National Strike Committee of Belarus, known informally as Stachkom or Stachkam is the unregistered Belarusian organization whose basic mission is to protect the rights of citizens (including arrangement of protest actions against violation of the rights and legitimate interests of citizens).

Strike Committee of Entrepreneurs of the Republic of Belarus works since 1996. On November 25, 2003, National Strike Committee of Belarus was founded based on it.

Since foundation, the chairman is an entrepreneur and former political prisoner Valery Levaneuski. During his imprisonment, from May 1, 2004 to May 15, 2006, the Acting Chairman of the Strike Committee was his son Uladzimir Levaneuski.

Protest actions 
January 1, 2000 - Five-days strike of entrepreneurs of Belarus. About 100 thousand strikers.

January 31, 2000 - Political meeting of entrepreneurs was held in Minsk. Meeting resolution included both economic and political demands (resignation of the Minister of Entrepreneurship)

February 1, 2000 - The majority of entrepreneurs of merchandise markets of Belarus started an indefinite strike, which was suspended on February 12.

November 23, 2000 - Warning strike of private entrepreneurs, supported by more than 150 thousand people.

January 1, 2001 - Five-days strike of entrepreneurs of Belarus, attended by about 200 thousand people.

May 8, 2001 - Nationwide political strike of entrepreneurs. The strike was attended by over 90 thousand entrepreneurs and employed persons.

May 18, 2001 – General republican political strike of individual entrepreneurs, timed to the Second All-Belarusian Public Gathering held in Minsk on that day.

June 20, 2002 - Strike of entrepreneurs in Grodno. All markets in Grodno were closed.

July 31, 2002 – Warning one-day nationwide strike of individual entrepreneurs was held in the Republic of Belarus. By estimate, the strike was attended by 100-150 thousand entrepreneurs and employed persons.

August 26, 2002 - Political meeting was held in Minsk in support of economic and other rights of entrepreneurs. It was attended by more than 2,000 people.

September 11, 2002 - Nationwide one-day political strike of entrepreneurs of the Republic of Belarus. The strike was attended by about 160 thousand entrepreneurs and employed persons from almost all cities of the Republic of Belarus.

September 12, 2002 - Nationwide campaign of civil disobedience was announced. The campaign continues to the present day as well.

October 1, 2002 - Nationwide strike of entrepreneurs of the Republic of Belarus with termination of payment of taxes and other payments to the budget. By estimates, the strike is attended by 120-190 thousand entrepreneurs and employed persons from almost all cities of the Republic of Belarus. The strike lasted 10 days.

December 19, 2002 – Strike of entrepreneurs in Grodno demanding resignation of the current president Lukashenko. More than 4,000 entrepreneurs have supported this demand and did not come to work.

January 22, 2003 - One-day strike of entrepreneurs in Grodno. Major markets and mini-markets of the city were closed; more than 8,000 people participated in this strike.

February 27, 2003 - Strike Committee of Entrepreneurs together with business structures organized a political meeting in defense of the rights of entrepreneurs.

March 12, 2003 - Strike Committee of Entrepreneurs together with several organizations held People's March “For Better Life”.

April 1, 2003 – “March to Parliament” campaign. Valery Levaneuski was detained and arrested for 15 days in the beginning of this campaign.

September 25, 2003 - Nationwide strike of Belarusian entrepreneurs. About 50% of Belarusian entrepreneurs participated in this strike.

May 1, 2004 - Demonstration in the center of Grodno. Number of participants was about 4 thousand people. The chairman of the Strike Committee, Valery Levonevsky was arrested for 15 days on that day, and then sentenced to two years of prison.

May 3, 2004 – Political meeting of entrepreneurs on Lenin Square in Grodno, attended about 1.5 thousand entrepreneurs. The same day, plainclothes police detained and then arrested Vladimir Levonevsky for 13 days for organizing protest actions.

March 25, 2007 - one-day preventive strike of entrepreneurs of Belarus took place in Minsk.

Other activities

One of the activities of the Strike Committee - support for prisoners. For example, in September 2005 Strike Committee gave books, sports equipment and other useful things to Ivatsevichy prison No.22. Local branches of the Strike Committee had been created in prison - by March 2005 in five Belarusian prisons such representatives were established.

References

Human rights in Belarus